The 1990–91 Primera División de Fútbol Profesional season is the 39th tournament of El Salvador's Primera División since its establishment of the National League system in 1948. The tournament was scheduled to end in, 1991. Alianza FC, the best regular season team, won the championship match against Luis Angel Firpo,the best team in the final group.

Luis Angel Firpo went 31 games undefeated, the second longest undefeated run at the time. Since that time, Alianza and FAS 33 games in 1977-78 games.

Teams

Managerial changes

During the season

Final

Top scorers

List of foreign players in the league
This is a list of foreign players in 1990-1991. The following players:
have played at least one  game for the respective club.
have not been capped for the El Salvador national football team on any level, independently from the birthplace

Acajutla
 

C.D. Águila
  Hugo Coria
  Salvador Filho

Alianza F.C.
  Eduardo "Tanque" Ramírez
  Carlos Solar
  Raul Toro
  Gustavo Faral
  Julio da Rosa

Atletico Marte
  Agustin Castillo
  Miguel Seminario

Cojutepeque
  Carlos Maldonado
  Percival Piggott
  Julio Cesar Chavez

 (player released mid season)
  (player Injured mid season)
 Injury replacement player

Dragon
 

C.D. FAS
 

C.D. Luis Ángel Firpo
  Toninho Dos Santos
  Nildeson
  Fernando de Moura
  Julio César Chávez

Fuerte San Francisco
 

Metapan

External links
 
 
 

1990